Benjamin J. Lawrence is a former guard in the National Football League. He was a member of the Pittsburgh Steelers during the 1987 NFL season.

References

People from Sparta, Wisconsin
Players of American football from Wisconsin
Pittsburgh Steelers players
American football offensive guards
IUP Crimson Hawks football players
1961 births
Living people
National Football League replacement players